Dirico  is a town and municipality in Cuando Cubango Province in Angola. The municipality had a population of 15,126 in 2014.

The town is served by Dirico Airport and lies on the Cuito River.

References

Populated places in Cuando Cubango Province
Municipalities of Angola